Grand Lake-Gagetown was a provincial electoral district for the Legislative Assembly of New Brunswick, Canada.  It was first created in the 2006 redrawing of electoral districts and was first used in the general election later that year.  Its last MLA was Ross Wetmore.

History 

It was created in 2006 from parts of Grand Lake and Oromocto-Gagetown.  From Grand Lake, it took Chipman, Minto and other communities around the Grand Lake area, however large portions of the district—both in terms of geographics with large forested areas in the west of the district and in terms of population with suburban areas just outside of Fredericton—were lost to the district of Fredericton-Fort Nashwaak.  From Oromocto-Gagetown it took all portions of the district north of the Saint John River, including the Village of Gagetown.

Members of the Legislative Assembly

Election results 

* This was a new district being contested for the first time, being made up in parts from the former districts of Oromocto-Gagetown and Grand Lake.  The majority of the district came from Grand Lake, which had been held by the Liberals, while Oromocto-Gagetown had been held by the Progressive Conservatives.  McGuinley was the incumbent from Grand Lake.

See also 
 New Brunswick electoral redistribution, 2006

References 

 "An Electoral Map for New Brunswick: Final Report of the Electoral Boundaries and Representation Commission" 
 Office of the Chief Electoral Officer.  "2006 Provincial Election Results"

External links 
Website of the Legislative Assembly of New Brunswick

Former provincial electoral districts of New Brunswick